is the 19th single by Japanese singer/songwriter Chisato Moritaka. Written by Moritaka, the single was released with "Memories" by Warner Music Japan on June 25, 1993. Both songs were used in the Fuji TV variety show .

Music video 
The music video is a parody of Alien films, with Moritaka playing a soldier frantically running away from a giant alien in an abandoned building. Towards the end of the video, she realizes that the alien is a giant fly and hits it with a fly swatter.

Chart performance 
"Hae Otoko"/"Memories" peaked at No. 12 on Oricon's singles chart. It was also certified Gold by the RIAJ.

Other versions 
Moritaka re-recorded the song and uploaded the video on her YouTube channel on February 21, 2015. This version is also included in Moritaka's 2015 self-covers DVD album Love Vol. 9.

Track listing

Personnel 
 Chisato Moritaka – vocals, drums, piano
 Yuichi Takahashi – guitar
 Eiji Ogata – guitar
 Yukio Seto – bass
 Shin Hashimoto – piano
 Hideo Saitō – guitar, synthesizer

Chart positions

Certification

Cover versions 
 Cute covered "Hae Otoko" in the Limited Edition C & D versions of their 2013 single "Kono Machi".

References

External links 
 
 
 

1993 singles
1993 songs
Japanese-language songs
Chisato Moritaka songs
Songs with lyrics by Chisato Moritaka
Warner Music Japan singles